Head Phones President (stylized in all caps) is a Japanese metal band formed in Tokyo in 1999. Their sound has been described as alternative metal, progressive metal, avant-garde metal, and nu metal.

They have played various music festivals, including Loud Park 08, Taste of Chaos, Metal Female Voices Fest, sharing the stage with the likes of Slipknot, Avenged Sevenfold, Story of the Year, and In This Moment. They have also played in the U.S., Sweden, Australia, neighboring Asian countries, and South America.

History
After vocalist Anza Ohyama ceased performing with the Sailor Moon musicals in 1998, she embarked on a solo career for almost two years, receiving help from guitarist Hiro and his brother Mar. They had a desire to play heavier music, so together they formed the band Deep Last Blue. They found bassist Kawady and drummer Okaji and changed their name to Head Phones President before releasing their first single, "Escapism", in 2000. Bassist Kawady left soon after and was replaced by Take the following year.

Playing at small venues all over Japan, they started to gain more popularity. In 2002, the group released the EP ID, after which Take left due to family reasons and was replaced by Narumi. That year, Head Phones President had their first international tour, including a stop in New York City.

Head Phones President's first album Vary was released in late 2003, after which the band returned to America for another short tour and started releasing CDs in the United States.

Okaji left the band in October 2004, desiring to make his own music. They recruited support drummer Batch in January 2005 (he was made an official member on February 1, 2009). They continued to tour Japan, taking intermittent breaks to allow Anza to work on her solo career.

Head Phones President released their first DVD, Toy's Box, in August 2006. The band desired to tour Europe, and in February 2007, they went to Sweden for two performances. In November, they performed at the Pacific Media Expo in Los Angeles, California. Their second full-length album Folie a Deux was released on December 12.

In July 2008, they played the Formoz Music Festival in Taipei, Taiwan, and would return to the city again in July 2009. On October 7, 2009, the mini album Prodigium was released on the Spiritual Beast label, and was mastered at West Side Music by Alan Douches (Mastodon, The Agonist).

On September 3, 2010, they released the self-cover album Pobl Lliw, which includes rearranged versions of old songs as well as some all new tracks. On September 19, 2010, Head Phones President performed at D'erlanger's Abstinence's Door #005 with defspiral and Girugamesh. The concert was streamed worldwide live on Ustream.tv. The band returned to New York City to play three shows as part of Frank Wood's 10 Days of Wood music event in November. On November 24, 2010, the band announced that guitarist Mar had resigned from the band due to unspecified personal reasons. The band publicly wished him well and stated that they would continue activities without him.

On April 2, 2012, Head Phones President released "Purge the World", a memorial single for their US tour which began on April 6. Their third full-length album Stand in the World was released on June 6, 2012. In December 2013, the band went on a four date tour of China that took them to Hong Kong, Guangzhou, Beijing, and Shanghai.

Head Phones President released their fourth album Disillusion on August 6, 2014. They also performed at Yoko Fest The Final on September 12 in memory of United's deceased bassist and leader and at Belgium's Metal Female Voices Fest on October 17 and 19, 2014. The band released their first compilation album Alteration on November 18, 2015, which also includes six remixes, in celebration of the 15th anniversary of their first EP.

The music of Head Phones President was the genesis of the rock musical Stand in the World, written and directed by Shohei Hayashi, which ran at the Tokyo Arts Center from June 11–13, 2016. The band performed during the show which starred Erika Yamakawa, Manabu Oda, and Hikari Ono.

Their fifth studio album, Realize, was released on May 17, 2017. Respawn, their sixth album, was released on July 24, 2019.

Musical style
The band has described their music as "negative" due to their emotional lyrics that stem from traumatic experiences, but believe the music expresses their struggles in a hopeful manner. For example, the song "Alien Blood" represents Anza's troubles growing up in Japan as mixed race; "I had problems with other students. People would try to burn my house". She writes all of the lyrics, but Narumi helps translate them into English. Anza has stated that she wanted to be the female version of hide, an influence that inspired her to express herself in a way that she could not in the pop music she used to make before Head Phones President. Anza and Narumi like nu metal from the 2000s, such as Korn and Limp Bizkit, while Hiro prefers older metal from Los Angeles. In addition to the bands Nirvana and Boøwy, the members have also cited non-musical influences such as actress Minako Honda, mafia films, and director Martin Scorsese.

Members

Current members
 Anza Ohyama – vocals (1999–present)
 Hiroaki "Hiro" Saito – guitar  (1999–present)
 Ryuichiro Narumi – bass (2002–present)
 Batch – drums (2009–present, support member from 2005–2009)

Former members
 Kawady – bass (2000)
 Take – bass (2002)
 Okaji – drums (2000–2004)
 Mar – guitar  (1999–2010)

Discography

Studio albums
 Vary (April 25, 2003)
 Folie a Deux (December 12, 2007)
 Stand in the World (June 6, 2012) Oricon Albums Chart Peak Position: No. 146
 Disillusion (August 6, 2014) No. 132
 Realize (May 17, 2017) No. 168
 Respawn (July 24, 2019) No. 259

Other albums
 Pobl Lliw (September 3, 2010, self-cover)
 Alteration (November 18, 2015, compilation) No. 239
 Devilize It (March 20, 2018, live)

EPs
 ID (February 9, 2002)
 Vacancy (November 23, 2005)
 Prodigium (October 7, 2009) No. 294

Singles
 "Escapism" (December 6, 2000)
 "Crap Head" (May 16, 2001)
 "De Ja Dub" (April 23, 2004)
 "Whiterror" (June 6, 2005)
 "Purge the World" (April 2, 2012, US only)

DVDs
 Toy's Box (August 30, 2006)
 Paralysed Box (October 29, 2008)
 Delirium (July 6, 2011)
 Stand in the World - The Rock Musical Show (December 28, 2016)
 Realize It (April 25, 2018) No. 251

References

External links

 Official website
 Stand in the World musical website

Japanese alternative metal musical groups
Japanese avant-garde metal musical groups
Japanese nu metal musical groups
Musical groups established in 1999
Musical groups from Tokyo
1999 establishments in Japan
English-language musical groups from Japan
Female-fronted musical groups